The 14th National Geographic Bee was held in Washington, D.C. on May 22, 2002, sponsored by the National Geographic Society. The final competition was moderated by Jeopardy! host Alex Trebek. The winner was Calvin McCarter, a homeschooled student from Jenison, Michigan, who won a $25,000 college scholarship and lifetime membership in the National Geographic Society. As of 2019, McCarter is the only 5th grader to have won the competition.  The 2nd-place winner, Matthew Russell of Bradford, Pennsylvania, won a $15,000 scholarship. The 3rd-place winner, Erik Miller of Kent, Washington, won a $10,000 scholarship.

References

External links
 National Geographic Bee Official Website

National Geographic Bee